Underworld is the fourth studio album by Australian band Tonight Alive, released on 12 January 2018. It is the last album to feature founding member and guitarist Whakaio Taahi, who departed the band upon the record's completion. The album was recorded in Thailand by producer Dave Petrovic, who has worked on nearly every Tonight Alive release to date. Underworld is the first album of the band's to be released on Australian independent label UNFD. It features contributions from Slipknot and Stone Sour frontman Corey Taylor, as well as PVRIS vocalist Lynn Gunn.

The album's first single, "Temple", was released in October 2017. It was followed by two further singles – "Crack My Heart" in December 2017, and "Disappear" in January 2018.

Track listing

Personnel
Tonight Alive
Jenna McDougall – lead vocals, backing vocals, vocoder
Whakaio Taahi – guitar, keyboards, piano
Jake Hardy – guitar
Cameron Adler – bass, backing vocals
Matty Best – drums, percussion

Additional personnel
Corey Taylor – vocals ("My Underworld")
Lyndsey Gunnulfsen – backing vocals ("Disappear")

Charts

References

Tonight Alive albums
2018 albums
Hopeless Records albums
Pop rock albums